The Rush Creek Wind Project is a 600 megawatt (MW) wind facility in eastern Colorado, located south of the town of Limon.  It increased the wind generating capacity in the state by 20% when it came online in late 2018.  The facility is financed, owned, and operated by Xcel Energy,  the largest public utility in the state. The project was developed primarily for its numerous economic benefits since Xcel previously met the minimum 30% requirement of Colorado's 2020 renewable portfolio standard.

Facility details

The facility consists of two wind farms that occupy 95,000 acres of leased private land.  The largest grouping of turbines is within Elbert County near the community of Matheson and located about 60 miles southeast of Denver.  A smaller grouping of turbines is located 35 miles east and spans the intersections of Cheyenne, Kit Carson, and Lincoln County near the town of Hugo.  83 miles of new 345 kV overhead transmission line carry the electricity to the Xcel Energy substation near Deer Trail in Arapahoe County.

Most components for the 300 Vestas 2.0 MW turbines were produced at the four nearby manufacturing facilities in Pueblo, Brighton, and Windsor, Colorado, which together employ about 3,500 people.   Overall, it is estimated that each turbine supports about 30 jobs over the course of its lifetime through its manufacturing, supply chain, construction, and operation.
The facility is also expected to generate $180 million in landowner lease payments and property tax revenues in the counties where it resides.

Xcel Energy contracted Invenergy to lead the development and asset management of the facility through the construction phase.  Mortenson Construction served as the EPC contractor for the project.   Construction began in June 2017 and completed in December 2018, employing about 350 workers.   The facility consists of 300 turbines, two substations, maintenance building, access roads, and transmission lines. About 10 permanent jobs were also created to maintain the facility, and Xcel has partnered with the Vestas operations group to assist with maximizing the electricity production.   It is expected to generate enough electricity to meet the needs of about 325,000 Colorado homes.

Electricity production 

(*) partial year of operation

See also

Wind power in Colorado
Environmental impact of wind power
List of wind farms in the United States

External links
 Rush Creek Wind and Transmission Project - Fact Sheet

References

Energy infrastructure completed in 2018
Wind farms in Colorado
Buildings and structures in Elbert County, Colorado
Buildings and structures in Lincoln County, Colorado